Fiktor Pae (born 7 February 1986 in Jayapura) is an Indonesian professional footballer who plays as a defender for Liga 2 club Persewar Waropen.

Personal life 
His older brother, Yustinus Pae, is also a professional footballer who plays for Persipura Jayapura.

Honours

Club
Persipura Jayapura
 Indonesia Super League: 2013

References

External links 
 
 Fiktor Pae at Liga Indonesia

1986 births
Living people
Papuan people
People from Jayapura
Indonesian footballers
Indonesian Premier Division players
Liga 1 (Indonesia) players
Cendrawasih Muda Manokwari footballers
Perseman Manokwari players
Persidafon Dafonsoro players
Persipura Jayapura players
Persija Jakarta players
Borneo F.C. players
Association football fullbacks
Association football wingers
Sportspeople from Papua